The Marriage Bargain is a 1935 American drama film directed by Albert Ray and starring Lila Lee and Lon Chaney Jr. It was the last film in which Lon Chaney Jr was billed under his real name Creighton Chaney.

It was also known under the alternative title of Woman of Destiny.

Plot

References

External links 

1935 films
1935 crime drama films
Films directed by Albert Ray
American black-and-white films
American crime drama films
1930s English-language films
1930s American films